Wang Yue (born 8 May 1999) is a Chinese visually impaired cross-country skier and biathlete who competed at the 2022 Winter Paralympics.

Career
Wang represented China at the 2022 Winter Paralympics and won a silver medal in the 10 kilometre free cross-country skiing event and a bronze medal in the women's 10 kilometre biathlon event.

References 

Living people
1999 births
Biathletes at the 2022 Winter Paralympics
Medalists at the 2022 Winter Paralympics
Paralympic silver medalists for China
Paralympic bronze medalists for China
Paralympic medalists in biathlon
Paralympic medalists in cross-country skiing